The prime minister of Latvia is the most powerful member of the Government of Latvia, who presides over the Latvian Cabinet of Ministers. The officeholder is nominated by the president of Latvia, but must be able to obtain the support of a parliamentary majority in the Saeima.

The tables below display all Latvian prime ministers from both the first period of Latvian independence (1918–1940) and since the country regained its independence (1990–present). From 1990 to 6 July 1993, the head of government was known as the chairman of the Council of Ministers.

A direct translation of the official Latvian term is minister-president. Although the equivalent is used in some European languages, it is not used conventionally in English.

List

1918-1940 
Political Party:

1940-1990 

Political Party:

1990-present 
From 4 May 1990 after adopting the Declaration of the Restoration of Independence of the Republic.

Political Party:

Statistics 

 Notes
 During the 1918–1920 Independence War, Latvia was contested by two other governments: the government of Soviet Latvia, led by Pēteris Stučka, and the government of Andrievs Niedra, backed by Baltic Germans. Some sources may list Stučka and Niedra as prime ministers for periods when their governments controlled most of Latvia.

 On 15 May 1934, prime minister Ulmanis dissolved parliament and banned all political parties (including his own Farmer's Union), establishing authoritarian rule.

 Puppet leader appointed by Soviet authorities. Not recognized as such by the Latvian government.

See also
 Lists of office-holders

References

External links
 Official list from the Latvian Cabinet of Ministers

 
Latvia, Prime Minister of
Lists of political office-holders in Latvia
1918 establishments in Latvia

he:פוליטיקה של לטביה#ראש ממשלת לטביה